October 2014

See also

References

 10
October 2014 events in the United States